What For may refer to:

What For? (album), a 2015 album by Toro y Moi
"What For?" (Aisha song), 2010
"What For" (James song), 1988
"What For", song by Rooney from Calling the World
What For?, a 1975 children's book illustrated by Mick Inkpen